Pieter van der Nest is a South African rugby league player for the Tuks Bulls. His position is standoff. He is a South African international, and has played in the 2013 Rugby League World Cup qualifying against Jamaica and the USA.

References

van der Nest
van der Nest
Tuks Bulls players
Rugby league five-eighths